Miglakasimakhi (Dargwa: Миглакьасимахьи) is a rural locality (a selo) and the administrative centre of Miglakasimakhinsky Selsoviet, Sergokalinsky District, Republic of Dagestan, Russia. The population was 537 as of 2010. There is 1 street.

Geography 
Miglakasimakhi is located 25 km southwest of Sergokala (the district's administrative centre) by road. Kardamakhi and Kulkibekmakhi are the nearest rural localities.

Nationalities 
Dargins live there.

References 

Rural localities in Sergokalinsky District